Tynan is a census-designated place (CDP) in Bee County, Texas, United States. The population was 278 at the 2010 census.

Geography
Tynan is located along the southern border of Bee County at  (28.169448, -97.757946). Texas State Highway 359 passes through the community, which leads northeast  to Skidmore and southwest  to Interstate 37 on the outskirts of Mathis.

Demographics
As of the census of 2000, there were 301 people, 92 households, and 75 families residing in the CDP. The population density was 87.6 people per square mile (33.9/km2). There were 109 housing units at an average density of 31.7/sq mi (12.3/km2). The racial makeup of the CDP was 79.73% White, 1.33% African American, 1.66% Native American, 16.28% from other races, and 1.00% from two or more races. Hispanic or Latino of any race were 78.74% of the population.

There were 92 households, out of which 42.4% had children under the age of 18 living with them, 62.0% were married couples living together, 16.3% had a female householder with no husband present, and 17.4% were non-families. 15.2% of all households were made up of individuals, and 8.7% had someone living alone who was 65 years of age or older. The average household size was 3.27 and the average family size was 3.64.

In the CDP, the population was spread out, with 32.9% under the age of 18, 8.3% from 18 to 24, 26.2% from 25 to 44, 21.3% from 45 to 64, and 11.3% who were 65 years of age or older. The median age was 33 years. For every 100 females, there were 107.6 males. For every 100 females age 18 and over, there were 96.1 males.

The median income for a household in the CDP was $11,250, and the median income for a family was $11,786. Males had a median income of $15,833 versus $12,000 for females. The per capita income for the CDP was $5,874. About 43.8% of families and 47.4% of the population were below the poverty line, including 63.1% of those under the age of eighteen and 48.7% of those 65 or over.

Education
Tynan and its neighboring community of Skidmore are served by the Skidmore-Tynan Independent School District.

References

External links
 Handbook of Texas Online article

Census-designated places in Bee County, Texas
Census-designated places in Texas